Isolda (minor planet designation: 211 Isolda) is a very large, dark main-belt asteroid. It is classified as a C-type asteroid and is probably composed of primitive carbonaceous material. The spectra of the asteroid displays evidence of aqueous alteration.

It was discovered by Austrian astronomer Johann Palisa on 10 December 1879, in Pola, and named after Isolde, heroine of the legend of Tristan and Iseult.

In 2001, the asteroid was detected by radar from the Arecibo Observatory at a distance of 1.78 AU.

Between 2009 and 2022, 211 Isolda has been observed to occult seven stars.

References

External links
 The Asteroid Orbital Elements Database
 Minor Planet Discovery Circumstances
 Asteroid Lightcurve Data File
 
 

Background asteroids
Isolda
Isolda
C-type asteroids (Tholen)
Ch-type asteroids (SMASS)
18791210